Urkhuchimakhi (Dargwa: Урхьучи-махьи) is a rural locality (a selo) and the administrative centre of Urkhuchimakhinsky Selsoviet, Akushinsky District, Republic of Dagestan, Russia. The population was 2,290 as of 2010. There are 8 streets.

Geography 
Urkhuchimakhi is located 11 km northwest of Akusha (the district's administrative centre) by road, on the Akusha River. Tsunimakhi is the nearest rural locality.

References 

Rural localities in Akushinsky District